Peter Burák (born 17 September 1978 in Nitra) is a Slovak football defender who played for FC Nitra, Artmedia Petržalka and FC Nitra.

Domestic League Records

External links

References

1978 births
Living people
Slovak footballers
Association football defenders
Slovak Super Liga players
FC Nitra players
FC Petržalka players
AS Trenčín players
Sportspeople from Nitra